The Men's 5000 metres T11 event at the 2012 Summer Paralympics took place at the London Olympic Stadium on 7 September.

Records
Prior to the competition, the existing World and Paralympic records were as follows:

Results
 
 
Competed 7 September 2012 at 19:55.

 
Q = qualified by place. q = qualified by time. RR = Regional Record. PB = Personal Best. SB = Seasonal Best. DNF = Did not finish. DNS = Did not start.

References

Athletics at the 2012 Summer Paralympics
2012 in men's athletics